Avari Hotels International is a Pakistani international hospitality management company which operates five hotel properties in Pakistan, a duo in Dubai, and one in Toronto.

History 

Avari Hotels was founded in 1944 by Dinshaw Avari.

Avari Hotels' first location was the Beach Luxury Hotel in Karachi which opened in 1948. Later, the company established the 17-story Avari Tower Hotel with 120 suites in Karachi.

In May 2012, Avari Hotels partnered with Etihad to join the Etihad Guest loyalty program. In 2013, the group announced the launch of a major expansion phase. In 2017, Avari Hotels announced the opening of two 4-star hotels in Multan.

Description 

The hotel chain is owned by the Parsi Avari family and which was led by Byram D. Avari who was the Chairman of the group.

Locations 

Avari Towers Hotel, Karachi
Hotel Crown Inn, Karachi
Avari Hotel, Lahore

References

Hotel chains in Pakistan
Hotel and leisure companies of Pakistan
Hospitality companies of Pakistan
Pakistani brands
Privately held companies of Pakistan